Transhydrogenase may stand for
 NAD(P)+ transhydrogenase (Re/Si-specific)
 NAD(P)+ transhydrogenase (Si-specific)
 Proton-Translocating NAD(P)+ Transhydrogenase
 Hydroxyacid-oxoacid transhydrogenase
 Glutathione—cystine transhydrogenase
 Lactate—malate transhydrogenase
 Glutathione—homocystine transhydrogenase
 Glutathione—CoA-glutathione transhydrogenase